There are currently 32 active gas fired combined cycle power plants operating in the United Kingdom, which have a total generating capacity of 28.0 GW.

Decline of gas for power in the United Kingdom 
In 2016 gas fired power stations generated a total of 127 TWh of electricity. Generation has dropped to 119 TWh in 2017, 115 TWh in 2018, 114 TWh in 2019 and 95 TWh in 2020. The decline is largely due to the increase in renewable sources outweighing the decline of coal, and an overall reduction in demand.

List of active gas power stations

See also
 List of power stations in England
 List of power stations in Northern Ireland
 List of power stations in Scotland
 List of power stations in Wales
 List of active coal fired power stations in the United Kingdom
 List of electricity interconnectors in the United Kingdom

References 

Electric power generation in the United Kingdom
natural gas power stations
United Kingdom
Natural gas-fired power stations in the United Kingdom
Power stations in England